Thonburi University Stadium is a multi-purpose stadium in Bangkok, Thailand. It is currently used mostly for football matches and is the home stadium of Rajpracha F.C. The stadium holds 1,500 people.

Football venues in Thailand
Multi-purpose stadiums in Thailand